The Norwegian Forest and Landscape Institute was a research institute based in Norway.

Organizationally subordinate to the Norwegian Ministry of Agriculture and Food, it is autonomous in its research. It was established on 1 July 2006 through a merger of the Norwegian Forest Research Institute and the Norwegian Institute of Land Inventory. Headquarters are in Ås, and regional offices are in Bergen, Steinkjer and Tromsø.

The director is Arne Bardalen.

On June 30, 2015 the Institute was merged into the Norwegian Institute of Bioeconomy Research.

References

Research institutes in Norway
Multidisciplinary research institutes
Earth sciences organizations
Forest research institutes
Government agencies of Norway
Education in Viken (county)
Forestry in Norway
Scientific organizations established in 2006
2006 establishments in Norway